Shakarganj Limited, formerly known as Shakarganj Mills Limited, is a Pakistani conglomerate company active in the sugar, foods, and milk industries.

History
The company was established in 1967 by a Chinioti business family and is based in Lahore, Pakistan. Shakarganj Limited is a publicly-traded company traded on the Pakistan Stock Exchange.

In March 2003, the company produced more than 90,000 tons of sugar.

In August 2008, a new biogas power plant in Jhang, Pakistan was inaugurated which will generate enough power to support more than 50,000 homes.

Subsidiaries 
Many of this business group's manufacturing facilities are located at Jhang District, Punjab, Pakistan.

Shakarganj group has the following production units:
 Sugar Mills
 Biofuel Power
 Building Materials
 Food Products (a leading Pakistani producer of dairy products and fruit juices)
 Textile Division (yarn production)
 Farming (crops include sugarcane, wheat, gram, maize or corn, fodder and seasonal vegetables)

References

External links 
 Shakarganj Limited's official website
 Shakarganj Food Products Limited's official website

Conglomerate companies of Pakistan
Food and drink companies established in 1967
Pakistani companies established in 1967
Textile companies of Pakistan
Sugar companies of Pakistan
Farms in Pakistan
Food manufacturers of Pakistan
Companies based in Lahore
Companies listed on the Pakistan Stock Exchange